Brightburn is a 2019 American superhero horror film directed by David Yarovesky, written by Brian and Mark Gunn, and produced by James Gunn and Kenneth Huang. Starring Elizabeth Banks, David Denman, Jackson A. Dunn, Matt Jones and Meredith Hagner, the plot follows Brandon Breyer, a young boy of extraterrestrial origin reared on Earth who discovers he has superpowers, using them with dark intentions. The film was produced and financed by Screen Gems, Stage 6 Films, The H Collective and Troll Court Entertainment.

Brightburn was announced as "Untitled James Gunn Horror Project" in December 2017. Aside from Gunn as a producer, his brother Brian and cousin Mark penned the screenplay, which adapts the concept of Superman for explicit horror. Principal photography began in March 2018 and wrapped in May of that same year.

Brightburn was released in the United States on May 24, 2019, by Sony Pictures Releasing. The film received mixed reviews from critics, who praised the horror elements, gore, concept, and Banks' performance, but criticized its writing, special effects and pacing, and felt that the film did not deliver on the full potential of its premise. The film earned $32 million against a budget of $6–12 million.

Plot
In 2006, a spaceship crashes in a forest in Brightburn, Kansas. Tori and Kyle Breyer, a couple who are trying but unable to conceive, see an explosion from their house and seek out the crash site. When they reach the crash they find a spaceship with a baby inside, who they adopt and name Brandon. The spacecraft is then hidden in their barn which Brandon's parents tell him to stay away from.

Around Brandon's 12th birthday he begins to discover he has exceptional strength, as well as the ability to fly. It is also revealed that Brandon has never bled or received a bruise. His mood also changes from a sweet child to having anger and temper issues.

In middle school, Brandon is an academically exceptional student but socially awkward and frequently bullied. Caitlyn Connor, a girl in Brandon's class, shows sympathy for him and tells him that smart people end up ruling the world. Brandon then develops a crush on her and stalks her in her room in the middle of the night, scaring her. 

One day during a trust exercise in PE, Brandon falls towards Caitlyn, but she lets him drop to the ground and accuses him of being a pervert. Frustrated by her accusation, Brandon crushes her hand and is suspended from school. That night, Brandon sleepwalks once again to the ship and breaks into the barn where it is hidden, cutting his hand on the ship. Tori follows and sees him levitating, chanting the ship's message: "Take the world". Tori reveals the truth of his origin, and Brandon goes on a rampage, killing Erika Connor, Caitlyn's mother, after Erika expressed displeasure towards him because he broke Caitlyn's hand. Police find a series of symbols drawn on a window while investigating Erika's disappearance: these are the same symbols that Brandon is seen drawing in his notebook earlier in the film.

The next day, Brandon kills his uncle Noah by lifting and dropping his vehicle. The following morning, Tori and Kyle inform Brandon of Noah's death, which the police believe was an accident, but Brandon shows no emotion or empathy. Suspecting Brandon to be the killer, Kyle finds Brandon's blood-stained shirt and shows it to Tori, but she refuses to believe it.

Kyle takes Brandon on a father-son hunting trip in the woods. Kyle attempts to shoot and kill Brandon with his hunting rifle, but the execution fails when the bullet bounces off the back of Brandon's head; Brandon then kills him with heat vision. A sheriff arrives at the Breyers' and asks to see Brandon. Tori tells the sheriff that Kyle and Brandon are not home, so he shows Tori the symbol found at the scenes of Erika's and Noah's deaths. Tori finds Brandon's notebook with drawings of his murders, the same symbol that the sheriff found at both murders and his message to "take the world" and begins to believe Kyle. She tries calling Kyle, but Brandon answers and implies he is now coming for her.

Brandon returns and begins destroying the house. Tori calls 911, but both the sheriff and his deputy are killed by Brandon before backup can arrive. Remembering that the ship's hull can cut Brandon, Tori runs to the barn and discovers Erika's eviscerated body. As Brandon pursues her, Tori tries to tell him about how much she loves him. She then tries to stab him with a piece of the ship, but Brandon grabs her arm, tosses the shard to the floor, and flies his mother into the sky to drop her, then sees an oncoming airplane.

The following morning, the airplane is revealed to have mysteriously crashed into the farmhouse, destroying the evidence of his murders the previous night. Brandon's symbol is seen painted on a piece of the plane wreckage.

In a credits scene, Brandon (now identified as Brightburn) is seen from the perspective of news reports and eyewitness footage over the locations of various disasters such as a building collapse and wildfire as they happen. An online conspiracy theorist posts his own video analyzing the disasters and referencing attacks by other cryptids elsewhere in the world.

Cast

Rainn Wilson cameos in a photograph during the credits as his character Crimson Bolt from James   Gunn's Super. Mike Dunston, Terence Rosemore, and Elizabeth Becka appear as a gym teacher, a reporter, and Brandon's school principal.

Production
The film was announced in December 2017, then untitled, with James Gunn as a producer, his brother Brian and cousin Mark writing the script, and David Yarovesky directing. In March 2018, Elizabeth Banks, David Denman, Jackson A. Dunn, Meredith Hagner and Matt Jones were cast. Gunn was set to appear on a panel to discuss the project at San Diego Comic-Con in July 2018, but his appearance was canceled after news broke that Disney had fired Gunn as director of Guardians of the Galaxy Vol. 3 due to offensive tweets.

Principal photography began in March 2018 and wrapped in May of the same year in the U.S. state of Georgia. The building collapse was filmed in Ottawa, Ontario, Canada during the real demolition of the Sir John Carling Building on July 13, 2014. The middle school scenes were shot at the now-defunct Patrick Henry High School in Stockbridge, Georgia. It is the same location used for both Hawkins Middle and Hawkins High Schools in seasons 1 and 2 of Stranger Things (2016).

Timothy Williams composed the film score. The soundtrack is now released at Sony Classical.

Release

Marketing
There were plans to promote the film at the 2018 San Diego Comic-Con in July, but it was pulled at the last minute in the wake of James Gunn's removal from Walt Disney Studios and Marvel Studios, only for Disney and Marvel to reconcile with Gunn nine months later. On December 8, 2018, the first trailer for Brightburn was released online.

Critics viewed the trailer as an "Ultraman horror movie" due to the intentional similarities to Superman's origin story and as a deconstruction of the character. Fast Company stated that "although it's not officially a Superman movie, it walks viewers through every step of Clark Kent's origin story before taking a hard left turn".

On April 3, 2019, an art contest was launched after the release of the trailer to promote the film, and had concluded on May 20. The winners of the contest had their artworks used in marketing for the film, and received $2,000. On May 21, 2019, IGN promoted the film by uploading a prank of unsuspecting volunteers with the character Brandon Breyer. It was uploaded to their website and YouTube channel.

Another art contest was launched on August 5 to promote the home media release of the film titled "Band with Brightburn". Submissions had to depict other supervillains in reference to the ending scene of the film hinting at other superpowered characters. Actor Jackson A. Dunn was the judge of the contest, and it was sponsored by Collider.

Theatrical
Brightburn was released in the United States on May 24, 2019. It was originally scheduled for November 30, 2018.

Home media
The film was released on Digital HD on August 6, 2019 and on DVD, Blu-ray, and 4K Ultra HD on August 20, 2019.

Merchandise
In August 2019, it was announced a Halloween costume of Brandon Breyer was going to be sold exclusively by Spirit Halloween in October.

Reception

Box office
Brightburn grossed $17.3 million in the United States and Canada, and $15.5 million in other territories, for a worldwide total of $32.8 million.

In the United States and Canada, Brightburn was released alongside Aladdin and Booksmart, and was projected to gross around $12–16 million from 2,607 theaters in its four-day opening weekend. The film made $3 million on its first day, including $950,000 from Thursday night previews. It ended up underperforming, grossing $7.8 million over three days (and $9.6 million over the four), finishing in fifth. In its second weekend the film made $2.3 million, dropping 70.5% and finishing in ninth.

Critical response 
The website's critical consensus reads "Although Brightburn doesn't fully deliver on the pitch-black promise of its setup, it's still enough to offer a diverting subversion of the superhero genre." On Metacritic the film has a weighted average score of 44 out of 100, based on 31 critics, indicating "mixed or average reviews". Audiences polled by CinemaScore gave the film an average grade of "C+" on an A+ to F scale, while those at PostTrak gave it 2.5 out of 5 stars and a "definite recommend" of 39%.

Frank Scheck of The Hollywood Reporter wrote "While not exactly original, the premise is certainly effective enough. But Brightburn lacks the visual stylization or wit to elevate it from the realm of the crudely effective B-movie." James White from Empire wrote "Crossbreeding superhero tropes with horror staples was an idea laden with promise. Brightburn is enlivened by trademark James Gunn black comedy, but hamstrung by sketchy writing and a botched sense of dread."

Alex Arabian from The Playlist wrote "The film is a gem, especially for anyone yearning for a superhero film that gleefully torches the familiar 'good versus evil' formula and introduces far more sinister sensibilities."

Ed Gonzalez from Slant also gave a negative review: "The way the film shuttles through its 90 minutes, it’s as if it’s been stripped of its most crucial narrative parts."

Sequel 
In May 2019, director David Yarovesky stated that upon the film potentially being a success, the universe of Brightburn would be expanded upon.

In a later interview with Collider, Yarovesky confirmed that the film's credits making reference to a half-man/half-sea creature terrorizing the seas, Rainn Wilson's character Frank Darbo / The Crimson Bolt from Super, and a powerful witch who chokes her victims with a rope was intended to set up a sequel, in addition noting that an alternate ending to the film featured Emmie Hunter's "Caitlyn—[ending] with her in a lab fastening a robot arm on her broken arm, and her just pissed off", as well as mentioning "tons" of other such endings as having been discussed, as well as stating that "[i]f we were to expand the Brightburn universe in other installments and in other ways, we would probably be doing it in the exact same way, in total secrecy and then drop a cinematic trailer at some point that kind of teases what that new direction may be".

In June 2019, producer James Gunn stated that discussion of the sequel was happening, but he was busy writing and directing The Suicide Squad and Guardians of the Galaxy Vol. 3.

In August 2019, actor Jackson A. Dunn stated in an interview with Screen Rant that he would be interested in reprising his role as Brandon Breyer. In addition, Dunn said that he would like that future films cast up-and-coming actors in the lead roles.

References

External links

 
 
 

2019 films
2019 horror films
2010s coming-of-age films
2010s superhero films
2019 horror thriller films
2010s science fiction horror films
American coming-of-age films
American horror thriller films
American science fiction horror films
American science fiction thriller films
American superhero films
Films about adoption
Films about dysfunctional families
Films about extraterrestrial life
Films set in Kansas
Films set in 2006
Films set in 2018
Films set on farms
Films shot in Georgia (U.S. state)
Films shot in Ottawa
Mass murder in fiction
Matricide in fiction
Patricide in fiction
Screen Gems films
Stage 6 Films films
Parodies of Superman
Supervillain films
Superhero horror films
Films produced by James Gunn
2010s English-language films
Films directed by David Yarovesky
2010s American films